Abdullah Al-Deayea (born 1 December 1961) is a retired Saudi Arabian professional football goalkeeper who played for Al-Tai and Al-Hilal. He is the elder brother of the former goalkeeper Mohamed Al-Deayea and the father of Bader Al-Deayea and Sultan Al-Deayea. Mohamed started off as a handball player and came to football at the age of 15 as a striker, following the advice of Abdullah.

Honours

Al-Tai
Saudi First Division: 1984–85
Saudi Second Division: 1976–77

Al-Hilal
Saudi Premier League: 1995–96
Saudi Crown Prince Cup: 1995
Saudi Federation Cup: 1992–93, 1995–96	
Asian Cup Winners' Cup: 1996–97
Arab Club Champions Cup: 1994, 1995

Saudi Arabia
AFC Asian Cup: 1984, 1988

References

External links

1961 births
Living people
1984 AFC Asian Cup players
1988 AFC Asian Cup players
AFC Asian Cup-winning players
Saudi Arabia international footballers
Saudi Arabian footballers
Olympic footballers of Saudi Arabia
Footballers at the 1984 Summer Olympics
People from Ha'il
Al-Tai FC players
Al Hilal SFC players
Saudi Professional League players
Asian Games medalists in football
Footballers at the 1982 Asian Games
Footballers at the 1990 Asian Games
Asian Games bronze medalists for Saudi Arabia
Association football goalkeepers
Medalists at the 1982 Asian Games
20th-century Saudi Arabian people